Dr. Georges Fulpius (25 March 1886 – 23 September 1955) was a Swiss philatelist who signed the Roll of Distinguished Philatelists in 1953. From ca. 1920 onwards, Fulpius offered his Services as Official Expert, notably for the Durheim Issues (Ortspost, Poste Locale, Rayon I, II, III). Many better pieces of Swiss classic Philately still bear Fulpius' signature.

References

Swiss philatelists
1886 births
1955 deaths
Signatories to the Roll of Distinguished Philatelists
Fellows of the Royal Philatelic Society London